SRT-3025 is an experimental drug that was studied by Sirtris Pharmaceuticals as a small-molecule activator of the sirtuin subtype SIRT1. It has been investigated as a potential treatment for osteoporosis, and anemia.

See also 
 SRT-1460
 SRT-1720
 SRT-2104
 SRT-2183
 STAC-9

References 

Pyrrolidines
Thiazoles
Amides